Western Airlines was a major airline based in California, operating in the Western United States including Alaska and Hawaii, and western Canada, as well as to New York City, Boston, Washington, D.C., and Miami and to Mexico City, London and Nassau. Western had hubs at Los Angeles International Airport, Salt Lake City International Airport, and the former Stapleton International Airport in Denver. Before it merged with Delta Air Lines in 1987 it was headquartered at Los Angeles International Airport (LAX). Throughout the company's history, its slogan was "Western Airlines...The Only Way to Fly!"

History

Western Air Express
In 1925, the United States Postal Service began to give airline contracts to carry airmail throughout the country. Western Airlines first incorporated in 1925 as Western Air Express by Harris Hanshue. It applied for, and was awarded, the 650-mile long Contract Air Mail Route #4 (CAM-4) from Salt Lake City, Utah, to Los Angeles. On 17 April 1926, Western's first flight took place with a Douglas M-2 airplane. It began offering passenger services a month later, when the first commercial passenger flight took place at Woodward Field. Ben F. Redman (then president of the Salt Lake City Chamber of Commerce) and J.A. Tomlinson perched atop U.S. mail sacks and flew with pilot C.N. "Jimmy" James on his regular eight-hour mail delivery flight to Los Angeles.  By the mid-1930s, Western Air Express had introduced new Boeing 247 aircraft. Western Air Express built and owned Vail Airport, Montebello from 1926 to 1930 and the Alhambra Airport from 1930 to 1931. Western Air Express operated a seaplane route out of Hamilton Cove Seaplane Base on Catalina Island, California from 1928 to 1930

Transcontinental & Western Air
The company reincorporated in 1928 as Western Air Express Corp. In 1930 it purchased Standard Air Lines, a subsidiary of Aero Corp. of Ca., founded in 1926 by Paul E. Richter, Jack Frye and Walter Hamilton. WAE with Fokker aircraft merged with Transcontinental Air Transport to form Transcontinental & Western Air (TWA, later known as Trans World Airlines).

General Air Lines
In 1934 Western Air Express was severed from TWA and changed its name to General Air Lines, returning to the name Western Air Express after several months. In a 1934 press release by the company, it called itself the Western Air Division of General Air Lines. Its route map ran San Diego to Los Angeles to Salt Lake City.

Western Airlines
In 1937 Western merged National Parks Airways, which extended its route north from Salt Lake to Great Falls, and, in 1941, across the border to Lethbridge, Alberta. In 1941 Western Air Express changed its name to Western Air Lines and later to Western Airlines. (In 1967-69 Western called itself Western Airlines International.)

In 1944 Western acquired a controlling interest in Inland Air Lines, which became a subsidiary with Inland's schedules in Western timetables until Inland was merged into Western in 1952. Western started flying Los Angeles to San Francisco in 1943, so the Western/Inland route map was a W: San Francisco south to San Diego, north from San Diego to Lethbridge, south to Denver, and northeast to Huron. (It extended to Minneapolis in 1947.)

In 1946, Western was awarded a route from Los Angeles to Denver via Las Vegas, but in 1947 financial problems forced Western to sell the route, and Douglas DC-6 delivery positions, to United Air Lines. In 1947 Western extended the left arm of the W north to Seattle, and added San Diego to Yuma for a few years; in 1950 it extended the middle of the W north to Edmonton. It finally cut across the W in 1953 when DC-6Bs started a one-stop flight MSP-SLC-LAX; in 1956 it resumed flights west out of Denver, to San Francisco via Salt Lake. In 1957 it began Los Angeles to Mexico City nonstop DC-6Bs, and in December 1957 it began Denver-Phoenix-San Diego.

The airline's president was Terrell "Terry" Drinkwater. Drinkwater got into a dispute with the administration in Washington D.C. that hampered WAL's growth. Pressured in a famous phone call by President Dwight D. Eisenhower to "buy American made aircraft", Drinkwater reportedly responded: "Mr. President, you run your country and let me run my airline!" For years after this exchange, the federal Civil Aeronautics Board (CAB) would not award Western new routes while its competitors, including United and American, grew enormous even though all Western airliners were of U.S. manufacture while its competitors' fleets included aircraft produced in Europe. 

In August 1953, Western was serving 38 airports; in June 1968 that number had grown to 42.

In June 1960, Western Airlines introduced Boeing 707s (707-139s) between Los Angeles, San Francisco, Portland and Seattle. 720B nonstops MSP-SFO and MSP-LAX began in 1966, along with LAX-Acapulco. In 1967 WAL acquired Pacific Northern Airlines (PNA) based in Anchorage, Alaska, its main route being Anchorage-Seattle, which PNA served nonstop with Boeing 720s. Western added Vancouver in 1967, and in 1969 it started flights from several California airports to Hawaii.

In the late 1960s, Western aimed for an all-jet fleet, adding Boeing 707-320s, 727-200s and 737-200s to its 720Bs. The two leased B707-139s had been sold in favor of the turbofan-powered Boeing 720B. Lockheed L-188 Electras were replaced with new 737-200s. In 1973 Western added nine McDonnell Douglas DC-10-10s, marketing its wide-body cabins as "DC-10 Spaceships".  They had 46 first-class seats, 193 coach, and a lower level galley. From 1976 to 1981 the DC-10s flew Los Angeles to Miami nonstop.

In 1969, Western Airlines opened negotiations to merge with American Airlines. However, the merger was opposed by rival airlines such as Continental Airlines and the United States Department of Justice Antitrust Division under Richard Wellington McLaren. President Richard Nixon's attorney Herbert W. Kalmbach suggested that the antitrust suit would be dropped in exchange for a $75,000 campaign contribution to the Committee for the Re-Election of the President, which American Airlines CEO George A. Spater agreed to. However, the merger was nonetheless rejected in a 4–1 decision by the Civil Aeronautics Board in July 1972.

Western was headquartered in Los Angeles, California. After the Airline Deregulation Act in 1978, the airline's hubs were reduced to two airports: Los Angeles International Airport and Salt Lake City International Airport. Before deregulation, Western had small hubs in Anchorage, Alaska, Denver, Las Vegas, Minneapolis/St. Paul and San Francisco. In spring 1987, shortly before Western was acquired by Delta Air Lines, the airline had two hubs, a major operation in Salt Lake City and a small hub in Los Angeles.

At its peak in the 1970s and 1980s, Western flew to cities across the western United States, and to Mexico (Mexico City, Puerto Vallarta, Acapulco, Ixtapa/Zihuatanejo and Mazatlán), Alaska (Anchorage, Fairbanks, Juneau, Ketchikan, Kodiak and other Alaskan destinations), Hawaii (Honolulu, Kahului, Kona, and Hilo), and Canada (Vancouver, Calgary and Edmonton). New York City, Washington, D.C., Boston, and Miami were added on the east coast as well as Chicago and St. Louis, and cities in Texas (Austin, Dallas/Ft. Worth, El Paso, Houston and San Antonio), and New Orleans in the south. Western had many intrastate flights in California, competing with Pacific Southwest Airlines (PSA), Air California/AirCal, Air West/Hughes Airwest and United Airlines. In addition, Western operated "Islander" service with Boeing 707-320s, Boeing 720Bs and McDonnell Douglas DC-10s to Hawaii from a number of cities that previously did not have direct flights to the 50th state. In 1973, Western flew nonstop between Honolulu and Anchorage, Los Angeles, Oakland, California, San Diego, San Francisco and San Jose, California and one-stop between Honolulu and Las Vegas, Minneapolis/St. Paul, Phoenix, Sacramento and Salt Lake City. In 1981, the airline also flew nonstop DC-10s between Vancouver, British Columbia and Honolulu.

One of the smallest jet destinations was West Yellowstone, Montana, near Yellowstone National Park. Western flew Boeing 737-200s to West Yellowstone Airport in the summer, replacing Lockheed L-188 Electras. In the 1970s and 1980s, Western served a number of small cities with 737-200s including Butte, Montana, Casper, Wyoming, Cheyenne, Wyoming, Helena, Montana, Idaho Falls, Idaho, Pierre, South Dakota, Pocatello, Idaho, Rapid City, South Dakota and Sheridan, Wyoming. The 737 replaced Electras to all of these cities. In 1968 the airline was operating nonstop Boeing 720Bs between the Annette Island Airport (serving Ketchikan, Alaska) and Seattle in addition to 720Bs between Juneau and Seattle, and in 1973 was flying 720B nonstops between Kodiak, Alaska and Seattle.

In 1978, Western Airlines and Continental Airlines agreed to merge. A dispute broke out over what to call the combined airline: Western-Continental or Continental-Western, prompting an infamous coin toss. Bob Six, the colorful founder of CAL, demanded that Continental be "tails" in deference to its marketing slogan "We Really Move Our Tail for You! Continental Airlines: the Proud Bird with the Golden Tail". The coin flip turned up "heads". Six was so disappointed he called the merger off.

From October 1980 to October 1981, Western flew Honolulu to Anchorage to London Gatwick Airport with a single McDonnell Douglas DC-10-30; for less than a year starting in April 1981 it flew LGW to Denver, continuing to Las Vegas and Los Angeles. Another international route was Los Angeles to Miami to Nassau, in the Bahamas for a year in 1980–81. Western extended its network to New York City, Washington, D.C. and Boston, as well as to Chicago and St. Louis in the midwest, Albuquerque and El Paso in the west, and Houston, New Orleans, Miami and Fort Lauderdale. In 1987 Western had four Boeing 737-300 round trips between Boston and New York LaGuardia Airport, and a major hub at Salt Lake City International Airport and a small hub at Los Angeles International Airport.

Western Express

In 1986, Western entered into a code sharing agreement with SkyWest Airlines, a commuter airline. SkyWest (Western Express) Embraer EMB-120 Brasilias and Fairchild Swearingen Metroliners connected to Western mainline flights at Salt Lake City, Los Angeles, Las Vegas, Phoenix, San Diego, and other Western mainline destinations. In spring 1987 SkyWest/Western Express served 36 cities in Arizona, California, Colorado, Montana, Nevada, Utah and Wyoming. Western entered a similar code-sharing agreement with Alaska-based South Central Air, a small commuter airline that operated as Western Express as well, connecting to Western flights at Anchorage. Several cities in southern Alaska including Homer, Kenai, Soldotna were served by South Central Air operating as Western Express. After the acquisition of Western by Delta Air Lines, SkyWest became a Delta Connection code sharing airline.

Delta Air Lines merger

In the early 1980s Air Florida tried to buy Western Airlines, but it was able to purchase only 16 percent of the airline's stock. On September 9, 1986, Western Airlines and Delta Air Lines entered into an agreement and plan of merger. The merger agreement was approved by the United States Department of Transportation on December 11, 1986. On December 16, 1986, shareholder approval was conferred and Western Airlines became a wholly owned subsidiary of Delta. The Western brand was discontinued and the employee workforces were fully merged on April 1, 1987. All of Western's aircraft were repainted in Delta's livery, including ten McDonnell Douglas DC-10s. Delta eventually decided to eliminate the DC-10s from its fleet as it already operated Lockheed L-1011 TriStars, a similar type. Delta retained Western's hubs in Los Angeles and Salt Lake City; both remain major gateways and hubs for Delta.

Destinations in 1987

This mainline destination list is taken from Western's March 1, 1987, timetable shortly before the merger with Delta Air Lines. The airline's main hub was Salt Lake City International Airport with a smaller hub at Los Angeles International Airport.

 Acapulco, Mexico
 Albuquerque, New Mexico
 Anchorage, Alaska (ANC): Anchorage International Airport
 Austin, Texas (AUS): Robert Mueller Municipal Airport
 Billings, Montana
 Bismarck, North Dakota
 Boise, Idaho
 Boston, Massachusetts (BOS): Logan International Airport
 Bozeman, Montana
 Burbank, California (BUR):  Hollywood Burbank Airport, then Burbank/Glendale/Pasadena Airport
 Butte, Montana
 Calgary, Alberta, Canada (YYC): Calgary International Airport
 Casper, Wyoming
 Cheyenne, Wyoming
 Chicago, Illinois (ORD):  O'Hare International Airport
 Colorado Springs, Colorado
 Dallas/Ft. Worth, Texas (DFW): Dallas/Fort Worth International Airport
 Denver, Colorado (DEN): Stapleton International Airport
 Edmonton, Alberta, Canada (YEG): Edmonton International Airport
 El Paso, Texas
 Fairbanks, Alaska
 Fresno, California
 Great Falls, Montana
 Guadalajara, Mexico
 Helena, Montana
 Honolulu, Oahu, Hawaii (HNL): Honolulu International Airport
 Houston, Texas (IAH):  George Bush Intercontinental Airport
 Idaho Falls, Idaho
 Ixtapa/Zihuatanejo, Mexico
 Jackson, Wyoming
 Juneau, Alaska
 Kansas City, Missouri
 Kahului, Maui, Hawaii
 Kalispell, Montana
 Las Vegas, Nevada (LAS): McCarran International Airport
 Los Angeles, California (LAX):  Los Angeles International Airport - Secondary hub
 Mazatlan, Mexico
 Mexico City, Mexico
 Minneapolis/St. Paul, Minnesota (MSP): Minneapolis–Saint Paul International Airport
 Missoula, Montana
 New York City, New York (JFK):  John F. Kennedy International Airport
 New York City, New York (LGA):  LaGuardia Airport
 Oakland, California (OAK):  Oakland International Airport
 Oklahoma City, Oklahoma
 Omaha, Nebraska
 Ontario, California (ONT):  Ontario International Airport
 Orange County, California (SNA):  John Wayne Airport
 Palm Springs, California
 Pasco, Washington (Tri-Cities area)
 Phoenix, Arizona (PHX): Phoenix Sky Harbor International Airport
 Portland, Oregon (PDX): Portland International Airport
 Puerto Vallarta, Mexico
 Rapid City, South Dakota
 Reno, Nevada
 Sacramento, California
 Salt Lake City, Utah (SLC):  Salt Lake City International Airport - Primary hub
 St. Louis, Missouri (STL): St. Louis Lambert International Airport
 San Antonio, Texas
 San Diego, California (SAN): San Diego International Airport
 San Francisco, California (SFO):  San Francisco International Airport
 San Jose, California (SJC): Norman Y. Mineta San Jose International Airport
 Seattle/Tacoma, Washington (SEA): Seattle–Tacoma International Airport
 Sioux Falls, South Dakota
 Spokane, Washington
 Tucson, Arizona
 Tulsa, Oklahoma
 Vancouver, British Columbia, Canada (YVR): Vancouver International Airport
 Washington, D.C. (IAD):  Washington Dulles International Airport
 Washington, D.C. (DCA):  Ronald Reagan Washington National Airport
 Wichita, Kansas

Western had a flight between IAD in Washington, D.C., and DCA at one point in 1985.  In 1987 the airline had four round trip flights a day between Boston and New York LaGuardia.

Former destinations

Western timetables from the 1940s to the 1980s list service to the following at different times:

 Alliance, Nebraska
 Baltimore, Maryland (BWI): Baltimore/Washington International Thurgood Marshall Airport
 Brookings, South Dakota
 Cedar City, Utah
 Cordova, Alaska
 Cut Bank, Montana
 El Centro, California
 Fort Lauderdale, Florida (FLL): Fort Lauderdale-Hollywood International Airport
 Grand Junction, Colorado
 Homer, Alaska
 Hot Springs, South Dakota
 Huron, South Dakota
 Juneau, Alaska
 Kenai, Alaska
 Ketchikan, Alaska
 King Salmon, Alaska
 Kodiak, Alaska
 Lethbridge, Alberta, Canada (first international destination)
 Lewistown, Montana
 Logan, Utah
 London, England (LGW):  London Gatwick Airport (nonstop DC-10 service to Anchorage and Denver, one stop service to   Honolulu via Anchorage and direct to Las Vegas and Los Angeles via Denver)
 Mankato, Minnesota
 Miami, Florida (MIA): Miami International Airport
 Nassau, Bahamas (one stop DC-10 to Los Angeles via Miami)
 New Orleans, Louisiana
 Ogden, Utah
 Prudhoe Bay, Alaska
 Rochester, Minnesota
 Scottsbluff, Nebraska
 Spearfish, South Dakota
 Twin Falls, Idaho
 West Yellowstone, Montana (served on a seasonal basis primarily during the summer months)
 Yakutat, Alaska
 Yuma, Arizona

Revenue passenger miles

Advertising

Western contributed to popular culture with its 1960s era advertising slogan, "It's the oooooonly way to fly!" Spoken by Wally Bird, an animated bird hitching a ride atop the fuselage of a Western airliner, and voiced by veteran actor Shepard Menken, the phrase soon found its way into animated cartoons by Warner Bros. and Hanna-Barbera. Another famous advertising campaign by the airline centered on Star Trek icons William Shatner and Leonard Nimoy. Some of the carrier's last television ads, shortly before the merger with Delta, featured actor/comedian Rodney Dangerfield.

In the 1970s Western called itself "the champagne airline" because champagne was offered free of charge to every passenger over age 21. (Actor Jim Backus uttered the "It's the only way to fly!" phrase while piloting an airplane, somewhat inebriated, in the 1963 film It's A Mad, Mad, Mad, Mad World.)

Western Airlines was famous for its "Flying W" corporate identity and aircraft livery. Introduced in 1970, the scheme featured a large red "W" that fused into a red cheatline running the length of an all-white fuselage. This new corporate identity was the subject of litigation by Winnebago Industries, which contended the new "Flying W" was too similar to its own stylized "W" logo. In the 1980s Western Airlines slightly modified the scheme by stripping the white fuselage to bare metal, retaining the red "Flying W" (with a dark blue shadow). This color scheme was known as "Bud Lite" due to its resemblance to a popular beer's can design.

Western Airlines was a favorite first class carrier for Hollywood movie stars and frequently featured them in its on board magazine, "Western's World". Marilyn Monroe and many other silver screen actors were frequent flyers and the airline capitalized on it. Western had a famous flyer out of Seattle: Captain "Red" Dodge. Red worked previously as a helicopter test pilot, and got involved with flying for the Central Intelligence Agency (CIA) in his later years when he wasn't flying as captain on the DC-10. The movie Breakout starring Charles Bronson was based on his daring airlift of a CIA operative out of the courtyard of a Mexican prison. The Mexican government tried to extradite Dodge back to face charges. Red became wealthy leasing government storage units with unlimited government business but never again flew to Mexico.

The airline was promoted in the Carpenters promotional video for the track "I Need to Be in Love", released in 1976. The video shows exterior footage of a DC-10 in takeoff and landing shots, as well as seating promotions for Western's FiftyFair seating product, with shots of a cabin setting depicting what looks like business class of the DC-10.

During the 1980s, destination flights aboard Western Airlines were featured as prizes on televised game shows, including The Price Is Right and The $25,000 Pyramid.

Fleet

Fleet in 1986

In 1986 Western Airlines' fleet was 78 jets:

 Western used a McDonnell Douglas DC-10-30 starting in 1981 to serve London, England, United Kingdom. The DC-10-30 was the largest plane type ever flown by Western.

Fleet in 1970
In 1970 Western Airlines operated 75 aircraft:

 5 Boeing 707-320C (not included were 5 Boeing 707-347C ordered (assigned registration N1506W through N1510W) that were cancelled and acquired by the RCAF).
 29 Boeing 720 (720 turbojet and 720B turbofan models; the 720s were ex-Pacific Northern)
 6 Boeing 727-200
 30 Boeing 737-200
 5 Lockheed L-188 Electra (included passenger, freighter and passenger/freighter combi aircraft versions. Only turboprop type operated by the airline)

Earlier piston fleet

Western used a variety of piston-powered airliners including Boeing 247Ds, Convair 240s, Douglas DC-3s, DC-4s, DC-6Bs and L-749 Constellations. The Constellations had been operated by Pacific Northern Airlines and served smaller Western Airlines destinations in Alaska such as Cordova, Homer, Kenai, King Salmon, Kodiak and Yakutat from Anchorage or Seattle in the late 1960s.

Accidents and incidents  
 December 15, 1936: Seven died when a Western Air Express Boeing 247 crashed just below Hardy Ridge on Lone Peak near Salt Lake City, Utah. The major parts of the aircraft were hurled over the ridge and fell over a thousand feet into a basin below.
 January 12, 1937: Western Air Express Flight 7, a Boeing 247 flying from Salt Lake City to Burbank, crashed near Newhall, California, killing five of the 10 persons on board, including adventurer and documentary filmmaker Martin Johnson of Martin and Osa Johnson fame.
  December 15, 1942: A Western Airlines transport crashed near Fairfield, Utah, approximately 50 miles south of Salt Lake City, Utah, on the way to Los Angeles, California. The plane took off at 1:05 a.m. and was reported missing approximately 15 minutes later. Of the 19 passengers and crew aboard, 17 died.
 November 13, 1946: Western Airlines Flight 23 crashed into the mountains 12 miles south of Gorman, California, while descending towards Burbank Airport. All 11 on board were killed.
 December 24, 1946: Western Air Lines Flight 44 crashed into the Laguna Mountains while descending towards San Diego. All 12 on board were killed. The CAB investigation determined that the pilot misjudged his position relative to the mountains, and flew too low to clear terrain.
 April 20, 1953: Western Air Lines Flight 636, flying in the night, on the last leg of a Los Angeles-San Francisco-Oakland itinerary, descended below the prescribed minimum altitude of 500 ft and crashed into the waters of San Francisco Bay, killing eight of ten people aboard the Douglas DC-6.
 February 25, 1971 – Western Air Lines Flight 329, a Boeing 737, was hijacked by a passenger, demanding to be taken to Cuba but instead landed in Canada.
 March 31, 1971 – Western Air Lines Flight 366, a Boeing 720-047B flying from Los Angeles to Ontario, California, on a pilot proficiency check flight, yawed and rolled out of control, and crashed while in the process of executing a 3-engine missed-approach from a simulated engine-out instrument approach. The five crew members and only occupants died in the crash.
 May 5, 1972 – Western Airlines Flight 407, a Boeing 737, was hijacked by a man demanding to be taken to North Vietnam. After refueling in Tampa, Florida, the plane went to Cuba.
 June 2, 1972: Western Airlines Flight 701 from Los Angeles to Seattle was hijacked by Willie Roger Holder, a Vietnam War veteran, and his girlfriend Catherine Marie Kerkow. The hijackers claimed they had a bomb in an attaché case and demanded $500,000 and that Angela Davis, who was then on trial, be freed. After allowing half the passengers to get off in San Francisco and the other half to get off in New York on a re-fueling stop, they flew on to Algeria, where they were granted political asylum, joining the International Section of the Black Panther Party. It was and still remains the longest-distance hijacking in American history. Later, $488,000 of the ransom money was returned to American officials.
 March 31, 1975: Western Flight 470 was landing at Casper Airport when it overshot the runway, and struck a shallow irrigation ditch before stopping about 800 feet beyond the departure end of the runway. Weather conditions at the time were at minimum visibility with light snow. The Boeing 737-200 was written off beyond repair. Four passengers suffered various injuries.
 July 31, 1979: Western Airlines Flight 44 departed Los Angeles International Airport en route to Denver, Colorado, and Billings, Montana, via several other intermediate stops and then mistakenly landed at Buffalo, Wyoming, instead of Sheridan, Wyoming, which was the intended destination. No injuries occurred and the only damage was to the ramp at the airport, which was not designed to support the weight of the Boeing 737-200 jetliner. The incident prompted a legal battle and subsequent landmark aviation ruling of Ferguson v. NTSB.
 October 31, 1979: Western Airlines Flight 2605 crashed while landing at Benito Juarez International Airport in Mexico City, killing 73. The crew landed the DC-10 on a closed runway and it collided with construction vehicles during the attempted go-around.

References
Notes

Bibliography

 Pearcy, Arthur. Douglas Propliners: DC-1 – DC-7. London: Airlife, 1995, p. 14. .

Further reading
  - about the Flight 701 hijacking

External links

 Historical timetable covers
 Salt Lake City International Airport
 Early Aviators
 History of Western Airlines and the planes it operated - archive.org copy of now-defunct page

 
Defunct airlines of the United States
Companies based in Los Angeles
American companies established in 1925
Airlines established in 1925
Airlines disestablished in 1987
1925 establishments in California
1987 disestablishments in California
Defunct companies based in Greater Los Angeles
Delta Air Lines
Trans World Airlines
Airlines based in California